Tyler Dennett (June 13, 1883 Spencer, Wisconsin – December 29, 1949 in Geneva, New York) was an American historian and educator, best known for his book John Hay: From Poetry to Politics (1933), which won the 1934 Pulitzer Prize for Biography or Autobiography.

In 1900, Dennett enrolled at Bates College and then transferred to Williams College as a sophomore. After his graduation in the spring of 1904 and a year of work in Williamstown, Massachusetts he attended the Union Theological Seminary, where he was awarded a diploma in 1908. He served briefly as a Congregational minister before leaving to pursue a career in journalism.

In 1922, he published Americans in Eastern Asia, a study of American policy in the Far East, which was well received and was long held as an important work in the field. Dennett published "President Roosevelt's Secret Pact with Japan" in 1924, the subject of which came to be known as the Taft–Katsura Agreement. The paper put forth the thesis that formerly-isolationist Japan and the US began to carve up their spheres of influence, which would later become world empires, with the agreement, which was therefore of first-class importance historically. Later historians questioned that interpretation.

Dennett was awarded a Ph.D. in history from Johns Hopkins University in 1925 after doing research on Theodore Roosevelt and the Russo-Japanese War.

He taught American history at Johns Hopkins University (1923–24) and at Columbia University (1927–28), and international relations at Princeton University (1931–34). Dennett served as president of Williams College (1934–37), resigning after a disagreement with the college's board of trustees.

He died in 1949.

Among his numerous scholarly writings were The Democratic Movement in Asia (1918) and A Better World (1920).

Notes

Further reading
Borg, Dorothy. "Two historians of the Far Eastern policy of the United States: Tyler Dennett and A. Whitney Griswold," in Dorothy Borg and Shumpei Okamoto, eds., Pearl Harbor as History: Japanese-American Relations, 1931-1941 (1975) pp 551–574.

External links

1883 births
1949 deaths
People from Spencer, Wisconsin
Writers from Wisconsin
20th-century American historians
American male non-fiction writers
20th-century American biographers
American male biographers
Pulitzer Prize for Biography or Autobiography winners
Presidents of Williams College
Johns Hopkins University alumni
Johns Hopkins University faculty
Williams College alumni
Historians of American foreign relations
20th-century American male writers
20th-century American academics